This is a list of drama films of the 2020s.

2020

2021

2022

2023

2024

Forthcoming

References

Drama
2020s